Paul Gerard Capdeville Castro (born 2 April 1983) is a Chilean former tennis player. He was born in Santiago.

Tennis career
In May 2009, he achieved a career-high singles ranking of World No. 76.

At the 2006 French Open, Capdeville had a shoving incident with Mario Ančić, at the end of his second round match. The two players had to be separated by the chair umpire. Ančić and Capdeville were each fined US$3,000 for the incident.

Capdeville's best showing at an ATP event to date came at the 2009 Estoril Open, where he reached the semifinals. Other notable results include the quarterfinals at Memphis (2006), Washington (2007), Indianapolis (2008) and Viña del Mar (2009).

Capdeville has won ten challenger tournaments: Bogotá (2005), Florianópolis (2007), Binghamton and Aracajú (2008), Binghamton (2009), Guayaquil (2010), Guadalajara (2011), Binghamton (2011), Santiago (2012), and São Paulo (2013).

Capdeville was part of the Chilean Davis Cup team. In his first competitive match, he beat Austria's Stefan Koubek in five sets.

Capdeville announced his retirement after playing at a Davis Cup tie against Paraguay in 2014.

All Finals

Singles finals

Doubles wins

Performance timeline

Top 10 wins

References

External links

Capdeville Recent Match Results
Capdeville World Ranking History

1983 births
Living people
Chilean male tennis players
Chilean people of French descent
Tennis players from Santiago
South American Games bronze medalists for Chile
South American Games medalists in tennis
Competitors at the 2014 South American Games